"Bitter" is a song co-written and performed by American pop singer Fletcher; issued as the lead single from her third extended play The S(ex) Tapes. Two versions of the song were released: one version featuring producer Kito; and another version featuring American singer Trevor Daniel. Kito produced both versions of the song but she is not credited as a featured artist on the latter version.

"Bitter" was certified gold by the Recording Industry Association of America on September 20, 2021.

Music videos
An official music video was commissioned for each version of "Bitter". The music video for the version of the song featuring Kito was directed by Shannon Beveridge (Fletcher's ex-girlfriend). The music video for the version of the song featuring Trevor Daniel was directed by Brooke James.

Certifications

References

External links
 
 

 

2020 songs
2020 singles
Capitol Records singles
Trevor Daniel (singer) songs
Fletcher (singer) songs
Kito (musician) songs
Music videos directed by Shannon Beveridge
Song recordings produced by Kito (musician)
Songs written by Fletcher (singer)
Songs written by Kito (musician)